Semenovskaya is a rural locality (a village) in Zaborskoye Rural Settlement, Tarnogsky District, Vologda Oblast, Russia. The population was 49 as of 2002.

Geography 
Semenovskaya is located 10 km southeast of Tarnogsky Gorodok (the district's administrative centre) by road. Pavlovskaya is the nearest rural locality.

References 

Rural localities in Tarnogsky District